Frederick de Sola Mendes (July 8, 1850 in Montego Bay, Jamaica, West Indies – October 26, 1927 in New Rochelle, New York) was a rabbi, author, and editor.

Family history and education
Frederick de Sola Mendes was born into an old Spanish & Portuguese rabbinic family. He was the son of Rabbi Abraham Pereira Mendes, grandson of Rabbi David Aaron de Sola, and great-grandson of Haham Raphael Meldola. He was also brother of  Rabbi Henry Pereira Mendes. He was educated at Northwick College and at University College School, London, and at the University of London (B.A. 1869). Subsequently, he went to Breslau, Germany, where he entered the university and studied rabbinics at the Jewish Theological Seminary of Breslau. Mendes received the degree of Ph.D. from Jena University in 1871.

Rabbinic career
Returning to England, he was licensed to preach as rabbi by Haham Benjamin Artom, in London, 1873; in the same year he was appointed preacher of the Great St. Helen's Synagogue of that city, but in December removed to New York, where he had accepted a call to the rabbinate of Shaaray Tefillah congregation (now the West End Synagogue); he entered upon his duties there January 1, 1874 as assistant minister to Rabbi Samuel M. Isaacs. In 1877, Dr. Mendes was elected rabbi of the congregation and continued in that position until 1920 when he retired as Rabbi Emeritus.

Writings
Dr. Mendes achieved a great reputation for scholarship and writing power. In conjunction with his brother Henry Pereira Mendes and others, he was one of the founders of the American Hebrew and was its editor during the first six years (1879-1885). 
In 1888, he took part in the Field-Ingersoll controversy, writing for the North American Review an article entitled "In Defense of Jehovah."
In 1900, Mendes joined the staff of the Jewish Encyclopedia as revising editor and chief of the translation bureau, which positions he resigned in September 1902.
Associated with Dr. Marcus Jastrow and Dr. Kaufmann Kohler, he was one of the revisers of the Jewish Publication Society of America Version of the Bible. 
He also translated Jewish Family Papers: Letters of a Missionary, by "Gustav Meinhardt" (Dr. William Herzberg). 
Of his publications the following may be mentioned: Child's First Bible; Outlines of Bible History; and Defense not Defiance. 
He contributed also the article on the "Jews" to Johnson's Encyclopedia. 
In 1903, he became for a time editor of The Menorah, a monthly magazine.

References

External links
 http://www.jewishencyclopedia.com/articles/10667-mendes
 
 https://www.jewishlivesproject.com/profiles/frederick-de-sola-mendes
 https://www.nytimes.com/1920/11/10/archives/jewish-clergy-honor-dr-f-de-sola-mendes-tender-aged-rabbi-luncheon.html
 https://www.jta.org/1927/10/28/archive/rabbi-frederic-de-sola-mendes-dies-at-age-of-74
 https://commons.wikimedia.org/wiki/File:Frederick_de_Sola_Mendes.jpg
 https://www.sandpcentral.org/clergy

1850 births
1927 deaths
Spanish and Portuguese Jews
British Orthodox rabbis
American Orthodox rabbis
People educated at University College School
Alumni of the University of London
Jamaican emigrants to the United States
19th-century American rabbis
American people of Portuguese descent
Jamaican people of Portuguese descent